Mary Abbott may refer to:

 Mary Abbott (artist) (1921–2019), American painter
 Mary Abbott (golfer) (1857–1904), American golfer and novelist
 Mary Bethune Abbott (1823–1898), wife of Sir John Abbott, the third Prime Minister of Canada
 Mary Ogden Abbott (1894–1981), American artist, traveler and equestrian